This is a list of the 22 appointed members in the European Parliament for Sweden in the 1995 session (from 1 January 1995 until 16 September 1995), ordered by name. They were appointed, not elected. The first Swedish MEP elections were held on 17 September 1995.

List

Sweden
List
1995